Edward L. Fearon (September 20, 1859November 3, 1933) was a Canadian politician. He served on the North-West Legislative Assembly for Medicine Hat from 1894 to 1898.

Early life 
Edward L. Fearon was born September 20, 1859 in Scotland. Fearon moved to Kingston, Ontario in 1878 and joined the North-West Mounted Police where he was stationed at Fort Walsh.

Political life 
Fearon contested the 1894 North-West Territories general election in the Medicine Hat electoral district against incumbent Thomas Tweed. In the years prior to the election, the Medicine Hat community became divided with Tweed around the issues of prohibition, hospital supply purchasing and obtaining government contracts for friends. Fearon was a popular rancher near Maple Creek. During the campaign Tweed's opponents depicted him as hostile to labour, against provincehood, and an ineffective representative. Fearon defeated Tweed with 398 votes to Tweed's 309. Fearon did not contest the 1898 North-West Territories general election. When describing Fearon's term in office, Historian L.J. Roy Wilson described Fearon as a "very poor representative".

Later life 
Fearon joined the Klondike Gold Rush in 1898 and returned to ranching in Maple Creek in 1901. In 1902 he married Annie Hastings. Fearon died on November 3, 1933 at the age of 74.

References 

Works cited
 

1859 births
1933 deaths
Members of the Legislative Assembly of the Northwest Territories